"Akin Ka Na Lang" is a Filipino song recorded by singer and songwriter Morissette. It was written by Francis Kiko Salazar for the Himig Handog: P-Pop Love Songs songwriting competition (2014). The song entered the grand finals of Himig Handog 2014 but didn't receive any award. Even though the song didn't receive any award during the competition, it became one of the most popular ballad songs in the Philippines and gained various recognitions from different people around the world. It also became one of the bonus tracks in Morissette's debut album entitled "Morissette".

Notable live performances

ASAP "Philippine TV Program" (2014, 2018, 2019) 
In 2014, Morissette performed her hit song "Akin Ka Na Lang" on ASAP. In 2018, Morissette sang "Akin Ka Na Lang" on the ASAP stage again together with Mr. Ogie Alcasid, and with her international fans Pasqueletta Paulus from Malaysia, Bo-ra Kim from South Korea, and Sophie Drage from United Kingdom. In 2019, Birit Queens (Angeline Quinto, Morissette, Klarisse De Guzman, and Jona) made a comeback to celebrate Morissette's birthday celebration singing Morissette's hit song, Akin Ka Na Lang.

MYX Live! Performance (2017) 
In 2017, Morissette performed at MYX Philippines where the acoustic version of her original song, Akin Ka Na Lang. Her live performance video was uploaded at MYX Global's YouTube Channel and has currently 1.5M views (as of July 2022).

Wish 107.5 (2018) 
In 2018, Morissette sang Akin Ka Na Lang on Wish 107.5, which also helped the song to gain wide popularity. As of July 2022, her live performance of Akin Ka Na Lang on wish bus has 156 million views and 682 thousand likes.

Morissette is Made (2018) 
In 2018, Morissette held her first major concert at Araneta Coliseum. One of the key events in the concert was when the Asia's Songbird, Mrs. Regine Velasquez-Alcasid surprised everyone with her appearance at Morissette's concert, singing Akin Ka Na Lang with Morissette.

Music video 
The official music video of Akin Ka Na Lang was released on August 31, 2014. It was directed by Colegio de San Juan de Letran. As of July 2022, the official music video already garnered more than 33 million views on YouTube with more than 88,000 likes.

Other versions 
In 2015, one of the tracks in Morissette's debut album was her hit song "Akin Ka Na Lang". Aside from the original version of "Akin Ka Na Lang", an acoustic version was also released and became part of the official tracks of the album. In the same year, "Akin Ka Na Lang" also became the official soundtrack of Pasión de Amor. In 2020, Morissette released a Latin version of "Akin Ka Na Lang".

Cover versions 
Morissette's Akin Ka Na Lang is one of the popular songs used in singing contests in the Philippines. Many people around the world also did their own cover of the hit song like Katrina Velarde from the Philippines and Minje Kwon from South Korea.

In 2020, Jex De Castro released his cover of Morissette's Akin Ka Na Lang on digital music platforms.

In 2022, Gigi De Lana gave her own flavor of the song and became the official soundtrack of ABS-CBN's new television series, A Family Affair.

Accolades

Notes

References 

2014 singles
2014 songs
2010s singles
2010s ballads
Tagalog-language songs
Filipino language songs